A Aa E Ee (short for Athalo Aame Inthalo Eeme) is a 2009 Telugu language film directed by Srinivasa Reddy. The film stars Srikanth, Meera Jasmine and Sadha in lead roles. Krishna Bhagawan, Ali, Kovai Sarala, Kavitha, Hema play prominent supporting roles in the film.
The film was later dubbed into Hindi as Diljale The Burning Heart in 2011.

Plot
Chandram is an honest man and a devoted husband to Kalyani. His life takes a turn when he discovers that Pregnant Kalyani is suffering from a rare disease and he has to get Rs. 8 lakh for treatment. While gathering the amount, he is compelled to act as husband to Ramya, who is thought dead. However, Ramya comes back alive and now Chandram is caught between both women. What happens from there forms the rest of the story.

Cast
 Srikanth as Chandram, a cab driver
 Meera Jasmine as Kalyani
 Sadha as Ramya
 Telangana Shakuntala as Chandram's grandmother
 Tanikella Bharani as Ramya's father
 Kavitha as Ramya's mother
 Krishna Bhagawan as lawyer
 Hema
 M S Narayana as Surgeon
 Ali as Amnesia patient
 Brahmanandam
 Kovai Sarala
 Giri Babu as cab company owner
 Raghu Babu as Ramya's brother-in-law
 Sunil as James Bond 000
 Venkat
 Uttej as James Bond's assistant

Soundtrack

References

External links
 

2009 films
2000s Telugu-language films
Indian romantic drama films